Jean Bernadt (née Alkin) (19 May 1914 – 9 April 2011) was a South African anti-apartheid activist.

She was an active member of the Communist Party of South Africa (CPSA), the Congress of Democrats, the Federation of South African Women and the Black Sash among other institutions. In 1940 she married Himan (Himie) Bernadt and she had three children.

Education
1934   High School  Cape Town

1936    New York University – studied American Literature

Activities 
She was involved in a wide range of charity organisations, usually together with other women from the Black Sash and the Communist Party. She was a member of the Athlone Committee for Nursery Education. The Athlone Committee founded the first nursery school for Coloured children in Athlone in 1949 and also founded the Maynardville Open-Air Theatre on 1 December 1950 as a charity fund-raiser for underprivileged areas. Her and Margaret Molteno (chair and founder of the Athlone Committee) joined up with the Blouvlei community leader Dora Tamana in 1954 to work on community projects in the Blouvlei informal settlement. As far back as 1948, Tamana had started a community creche at a private house, but it had stopped after two and half years because of a lack of funding. The three women raised funds and established the Blouvlei Nursery School and family health centre according to Tamana's plans in May 1955.

She was under government banning orders from 1959 to 1964. Later she housed Nelson Mandela during his negotiations with the Apartheid government. In 1960 she was arrested and spent three months in jail.

Commemoration 
In 2008, Jean Bernadt and her husband were commemorated and awarded the Order of Luthuli for opposing racism and defending the anti-apartheid activists.

See also 
List of people subject to banning orders under apartheid

References

1914 births
2011 deaths
South African activists
South African women activists
White South African anti-apartheid activists
Black Sash
Women civil rights activists